The Moomins are characters in the books and comic strips of Tove Jansson.

Moomin may also refer to:

Moomin, or Moomintroll, the main character in Jansson's books and comic strips
Moomin (1969 TV series), a 1969–1970 Japanese anime television series, based on the book and comic strip series
Moomin (1990 TV series), a 1990–1991 Japanese-Dutch anime television series, based on the book and comic strip series
New Moomin, a 1972 Japanese anime television series, the second, based on the book and comic strip series
The Moomins (TV series), a 1977–1982 European stop motion children's television series broadcast in the UK on ITV, based on the book and comic strip series
Moomin World, a theme park in Finland based on the Moomin franchise
Moomin (singer) (born 1972), Japanese reggae singer
Moomin, Queensland, a locality in the Tablelands Region, Australia

See also
Mu'min, Arabic word for faithful Muslims

Moomins